Pinchie is the English name of the Carrier village of Binche on the northeast shore of Stuart Lake, outside of Fort Saint James in north central British Columbia. It is part of the Tl'azt'en Nation band. In 2006 it had a population of 110.

References
 Statistics Canada Information

Dakelh communities
Indian reserves in British Columbia